K. S. Adhiyaman is an Indian film director and producer, who has directed Hindi and Tamil films.

Career
Adhiyaman apprenticed under director K. Vijayan for eight films in the late 1980s, before deciding to become a film maker. After beginning his directorial career with a relatively unnoticed film in Thoorathu Sondham (1992), Adhiyaman wrote the dialogues for Suresh Menon's well received films Pudhiya Mugam (1993) and Paasamalargal (1994) and subsequently bagged the opportunity to make another film. Thotta Chinungi, a relationship drama featuring an ensemble cast of Raghuvaran, Karthik, Revathi, Devayani, Rohini and Nagendra Prasad, won critical acclaim and performed well at the box office. He then featured as an actor in Thalaimurai (1998) directed by Saravana Pandian and won acclaim for his performance, while making another family drama titled  Swarnamukhi which had Parthiban and Prakash Raj in leading roles.

Adhiyaman then chose to direct his first Hindi film and began remaking Thotta Chinungi in Hindi as Aap Mere Hai Sanam in early 1998. Notably, the film featured an ensemble cast of several leading actors including Salman Khan, Shahrukh Khan, and Madhuri Dixit while several music composers also worked on the film. The film languished in development hell and was eventually released in 2002 as Hum Tumhare Hain Sanam earning mixed reviews and below average collections, with a critic noting Adhiyaman's "overly simplistic direction lacks both pace and creativity." He then began making a project titled Mujhse Shaadi Karogi in 2002, a romantic drama starring Salman Khan and Shilpa Shetty. The project's title was changed to Dil Chura Ke Chal Diye and then to the eventual title Shaadi Karke Phas Gaya Yaar and the film was completed within a year, though the producers delayed the film's release indefinitely. Delays meant that Adhiyaman chose to remake the film and release it swiftly in Tamil as Priyasakhi (2005) with R. Madhavan and Sadha playing lead roles. Shaadi Karke Phas Gaya Yaar was finally released in August 2006, with the films earning mixed reviews in both languages. In between the ventures, he also started a film titled Hot featuring Neha Dhupia and Parvin Dabbas, but despite completing shoot has not released.

Adhiyaman made another family drama film titled Thoondil starring Shaam, Sandhya and Divya Spandana. Extensively shot in London, Thoondil began shoot in mid 2006 and progressed slowly before releasing to average reviews in February 2008, with reviewers calling it "melodramatic" and noting that it "starts promisingly and turns unsatisfying". Adhiyaman initially planned to remake Thoondil in Hindi with Vivek Oberoi and Bipasha Basu, as well revealing he was set to remake the 2004 Tamil film Ghilli in Hindi with Harman Baweja and Deepika Padukone.
He then announced that he was set to remake the Malayalam film Chinthamani Kolacase with Sunny Deol in Hindi as Judgement and would incorporate real life events of the death of journalist Shivani Bhatnagar into the script. Neither of the three films eventually materialised. In early 2010, he began a comedy film titled Amali Thumali featuring Nakul, Shanthnu and Swati Reddy in lead roles. The film was initially titled Nanba and had a tagline of 2 Idiots, and thus the media mistook this film for Shankar's Nanban, the remake of the 2009 Hindi film 3 Idiots. The film was later renamed Amali Thumali. Despite filming scenes in locations including Fiji in 2012, the film is yet to be complete and have a theatrical release. In 2014, it was reported that the director was considering directing a Tamil project featuring Nivin Pauly, Amala Paul and Nazriya Nazim in lead roles.

In August 2018, Adhiyaman was reported to be making a horror film titled Angel starring Udhayanidhi Stalin, Payal Rajput and Anandhi.

Filmography

References

External links

Tamil film directors
Living people
Hindi-language film directors
21st-century Indian film directors
20th-century Indian film directors
1965 births